In 1996, there were 40 original This American Life episodes; the first nine were broadcast under the original name of the program Your Radio Playhouse.

Air Date: 1996-01-03
Description: Stories that reflect back on 1995

Air Date: 1996-01-10
Description: When comedian Julia Sweeney and her brother both got cancer, she decided to tell the story the best way she knew how: in a comedy club. It might seem like a strange choice, but what resulted is halfway between standup comedy and true-life diary entries.
Prologue
Act 1: Julia's Brother Gets Cancer – Julia Sweeney
Act 2: Julia Gets Cancer – Julia Sweeney
The Kinks, Complicated Life
Willie Nelson, These Are Difficult Times

Air Date: 1996-01-17
Description: Susan Bergman's father was a family man, head of the church choir, and, secretly, having sex with men. He died before his children had a chance to really talk to him about what they should make of his hidden life. When Bergman wrote a book about her family's experience, other gay men tried to explain her father's actions to her. That, and other stories of parents deceiving their children.

Air Date: 1996-01-24
Description: A story of a friendship between two adolescent boys that was destroyed through the manipulative acts of one of them.
Act 1: Dave's Love
Act 2: Dave's Hate
Act 3: Dave Today
Act 4: Another Dave – David Sedaris

Air Date: 1996-01-31
Description: Stories about the animalness of animals, the irreducible ways in which they are not human.
Prologue
Act 1: Food Chain in a New York Apartment – Paul Tough
Shonen Knife, Insect Collector
Act 2: More Animals Eating Other Animals
Kathleen on the Carpet, a radio play by David Sedaris, performed by the Pinetree Gang
Lena Horne, Rocky Raccoon
Act 3:  The Moment Humans Stopped Being Animals – Scott Carrier
Louis Prima, I Wanna Be Like You, from Disney's The Jungle Book

Air Date: 1996-02-07
Description: Explorations of the dream of true love ... and the difficulties with achieving and maintaining that dream.
Prologue
Al Green, Love and Happiness
Act 1: Yearning
Act 2: Sex
Madonna, Forbidden Love
Act 3: A Wedding
Ready, an original song performed by kids at Daniel J. Nellum Youth Services in Chicago

Air Date: 1996-02-21
Description: Stories made from old tapes found in various places, including a "letter on tape" found in a Salvation Army thrift store. Host Ira Glass with tapes of his father on the radio, circa 1956. And radio producer Nora Moreno with tapes of her father, a Spanish broadcasting pioneer in America. Her mother fell in love with him over the radio, with tragic results.
Prologue
Act 1: Berrian Springs Michigan, Circa 1967 – Davis family tapes
James Brown, It's a Man's World
Act 2: Baltimore, Circa 1956 – Ira Glass plays tapes of his father, Barry Glass, as a radio deejay in the 1950s
Nat King Cole, Personal Possession
Act 3: Chicago, in the 1960s – Nora Moreno
José Alfredo Jiménez, El Rey

Air Date: 1996-02-28
Description: Writer Jack Hitt goes on a search for a mysterious neighbor from his childhood in Charleston, South Carolina, and stumbles onto an epic story of the Old South, the New South, gender confusion, Chihuahuas, and changing values in American journalism.
Prologue
Digital Underground, ?
Act 1: Dawn – Jack Hitt tells the story of Gordon Langley Hall, a.k.a. Dawn Langley Hall Simmons
Marlene Dietrich, ?
Act 2 – from the 1998 rebroadcast of this episode, Jack Hitt discusses his new conclusions two-and-a-half years after his first report of the story

Air Date: 1996-03-14
Description: Stories of politics, the economy, and the big picture.

Air Date: 1996-03-21
Description: First show as This American Life.

Air Date: 1996-03-28
Description: April first is the one day of the year when we're allowed to enjoy deceiving others. But April Fools' Day is for amateur deceivers. The real pros are the people who can't control their lying, who lie without even knowing what the truth is. Everyone's known someone like this, but it's a topic that's only rarely studied or discussed publicly. Journalist and TAL contributing editor Margy Rochlin co-hosts.

Air Date: 1996-04-12
Description: Men who had comfortable decent lives, yet decided to do something wild and eccentric with their lives instead.

Air Date: 1996-04-19
Description: Stories of hero worship, of people admiring someone from afar, and trying to get closer to them.

Air Date: 1996-04-26
Description: A show about something most people have gone through. Friends get together to start a business, start a church, do political action together. And after a while, they start fighting and split up. We hear three true stories.

Air Date: 1996-05-03
Description: Stories of the difficult relationships between parents and their grown children, including two long stories from Sandra Tsing Loh about her father.

Air Date: 1996-05-10
Description: Stories of the people who fall for a life in the theater.

Air Date: 1996-05-24
Description: Stories of girls who have to figure out how they're going to act when the ground rules are constantly shifting.

Air Date: 1996-06-07
Description: A set of documentary stories, radio essays and monologues about basketball, the Chicago Bulls, and their grip on Chicagoans' hearts and lives during the NBA Playoffs. These are unusual stories about people in the throes of love for basketball, including a story about the dreams about the Bulls Chicagoans have while sleeping.

Air Date: 1996-06-14
Description: Ira's own father Barry Glass co-hosts this special father's day edition of the show.

Air Date: 1996-06-21
Description: Stories about kids being mean to each other.

Air Date: 1996-07-12
Description: Writer David Sedaris recalls the days when his mother and sister played armchair detective—until a very odd crime wave hit within their own home. Plus, host Ira Glass goes out on surveillance with a real-life private eye.

Air Date: 1996-07-19
Description: Unusual perspectives on the presumptive Republican nominee.

Air Date: 1996-07-26
Description: Stories of obsession and compulsion. What happens when a little idea starts to control you. Co-hosted by Paul Tough.

Air Date: 1996-08-09
Description: Stories of people whose lives are transformed by music.

Air Date: 1996-08-16
Description: More campaign diaries from The New Republic's Michael Lewis.

Air Date: 1996-08-23
This episode is about the unique culture in a Chicago fast food restaurant.
Prologue – New introduction recorded in 2006, saying this show was never broadcast nationally – Ira Glass
Ira records various colorful personalities at the Wiener's Circle.
Act Two: "The Customer" by Beau O'Reilly.
Act Three: "A Parable of Politics" by Shirley Jahad.
Act Four: "Fast Food Heart" by Cassandra Smith.

Air Date: 1996-08-30
Description: Unusual stories from the 1996 Democratic Convention in Chicago, with scenes and moments not documented elsewhere.

Air Date: 1996-09-06
Description: Evocative, funny emotional stories collected over the last few months that haven't fit into any of our regular "theme" shows.
Ira Glass at the Navy Pier 
David Sedaris recollections from the nudist camp
"Haiku stories" by Scott Carrier
Zoofilia, the stallion
Carmen Detzell Her grandmother's beliefs and the guitar player

Air Date: 1996-09-20
Description: Open Mic at the Lunar Cabaret. Host Ira Glass and playwright David Hauptschein took out advertisements in Chicago inviting people to come to a small theater with letters they've received, sent or found. People came for two nights and read their letters onstage. Some were funny. Some were poignant. They told a wide range of stories: a heartfelt letter from prison, a hilariously pretentious job letter sent to the New Yorker magazine, a ringingly sincere teenage "should we be more than friends" letter. Four hours of letters were recorded in all. These were edited down to an hour of letters, with a few unusual songs about letters thrown in.

Air Date: 1996-09-27
Description: Radio producer Scott Carrier quit his job at a low moment in his life. His wife left him and took the kids. And he got a job interviewing schizophrenics for some medical researchers. After doing it a while, he began to wonder if he was a schizophrenic himself. And more stories.
Prologue – Ira Glass; his job.
Act 1: The Test – Scott Carrier (later published in his book Running After Antelope); interviewing individuals with Schizophrenia.
Merle Haggard, Workin' Man's Blues
Act 2: Tribe – Peter Clowney interviews cast members of a production of Hair.
Act 3: The Port Chicago 50: An Oral History – Dan Collison interviews Albert Williams, Freddy Meeks, Joseph Small, Percy Robinson, and Robert Routh, survivors of the Port Chicago disaster; unsafe conditions working with ammunition.
Josh White, Uncle Sam Says
Act 4: Orientation – Matt Malloy reads Daniel Orozco's short story 
The Company Way (from How to Succeed in Business Without Really Trying by Frank Loesser)

Air Date: 1996-10-11
Description: Simulated worlds, Civil war reenactments, wax museums, simulated coal mines, fake ethnic restaurants, an ersatz Medieval castle and other re-created worlds that thrive all across America.
Act I: Travels in Hyper-Reality; a Quick National Tour.
Act II: Simulated Dinosaur Worlds.
Act III: Ira Glass and Michael Camille, a scholar from the University of Chicago, attend Medieval Times.

Air Date: 1996-10-25
Description: This week: A show for Halloween. Stories of things that are supposed to be scary, but aren't.
Act 1: Dark Shadows
Act II: A Scientist in a Haunted House.
Act III: Vampire Girl.
Act IV: Discovering Evil.
Act V: Gang Girl.
Act VI: (Your) Screams.

Air Date: 1996-11-01
Description: Stories from acclaimed storyteller Spalding Gray and others.
Act I: Ski Lessons.
Act II: Swimming Lessons; Harvard instructor.
Act III: Shooting Lessons; spud gun.
Act IV: Lessons for men on how to have an affair.

Air Date: 1996-11-08
Description: More stories of the election you can't hear anywhere else.

Air Date: 1996-11-15
Description: Three stories of people trying to forget the past and move on.

Air Date: 1996-11-22
Description: Inspired by a spate of new Chicago stage adaptations of the Faust story, This American Life brings you stories of people who made a deal with the devil.
Act I: Dangerous Minds; author and teacher LuAnne Johnson
Act II: Satan's telemarketer; voice artist pastor
Act III: Voyager;  Peabody violinist Mendelssohn
Act IV: Carmen becomes Faust
Act V: First Contact; the story of the kid and the devil

Air Date: 1996-11-29
Description: In the midst of the five biggest poultry-consumption weeks of the year — the five weeks between Thanksgiving and Christmas, when Americans consume one-fourth of all the turkey they eat in a year — This American Life presents stories about turkeys, chickens, ducks and fowl of all kinds.
Ducky
Chicken Man
Growing in a Turkey Farm
David Sedaris an excerpt from his diaries: A turkey head.
Chicken Rustler, South African Chicken Blood.
Chicken Man Like The Phoenix - New Episode since 1969

Air Date: 1996-12-06
Description: Four stories about people struggling at the fringes of our nation's media/music/infotainment industry.
Act I: How to Get Famous; Sandra Tsing Loh
Act II: Whoring in Commercial Radio News; Scott Carrier and The Friendly Man;
Act III: Doing a personal act for money; Sarah Vowell; analog love
Act IV: Lifestyles of the rich and famous; Cheryl Trykv

Air Date: 1996-12-13
Description: Though being gay no longer has much of a stigma in some parts of the country, being a sissy still does—even among gay men. In this show we have a number of surprising and unusual stories of sissies, their families, and why people still get so upset about them.
Act I: Anti-Oedipus
Act II: Instruction For Sissies; John Conners reads from: "How to Improve Your Personality"
Act III: Pancy Kings Sing Songs Of love; Dave Awl
Act IV: Dan Savage; Who Loves a Sissy? The Other Love That Dares Not Speak Its Name

Air Date: 1996-12-20
Description: Stories about the intersection of Christmas and retail, including David Sedaris's story "Santaland Diaries", which was first broadcast on NPR's Morning Edition several years ago in a much shorter version. The diaries are about David's two Christmas seasons working as an elf in Macy's department store on New York's Herald Square. When it was first broadcast, it generated more requests for tapes than any story in Morning Edition's history except the death of Red Barber. Also, David Rakoff on playing Freud in the windows of Barney's department store. And other stories.
Act I: Toys R Us
Act II: Davis Sedaris; Full Time Elf
Act III: Christmas Freud

Reruns broadcast in 1996
1996-02-14 – Episode 4: Vacations
1996-03-07 – Episode 7: Quitting
1996-04-05 – Episode 9: Julia Sweeney
1996-05-17 – Episode 10: Double Lives
1996-06-28 – Episode 21: Factions
1996-07-05 – Episode 9: Julia Sweeney
1996-08-02 – Episode 20: From a Distance
1996-09-13 – Episode 22: Adult Children
1996-10-04 – Episode 4: Vacations
1996-10-18 – Episode 15: Dawn
1996-12-27 – Episode 20: From a Distance

External links
This American Lifes radio archive for 1996

1996
This American Life
This American Life